The Gender Expression Non-Discrimination Act (GENDA) is a 2019 New York law which added gender identity and gender expression to the state's human rights and hate crimes laws as protected classes; banned discrimination in employment, housing, and public accommodations based on gender identity and gender expression; and provided enhanced penalties for bias-motivated crimes. GENDA was first introduced in 2003. The bill passed the New York State Assembly every year from 2008 to 2019, but did not receive a floor vote in the New York State Senate until January 2019. It was passed by each house of the New York State Legislature on January 15, 2019, and New York Gov. Andrew Cuomo signed it into law on January 25, 2019.

History
GENDA was first introduced in 2003. The New York State Assembly passed the bill every year from 2008 to 2019.

On June 8, 2010, GENDA was defeated in the Senate Judiciary Committee. On April 25, 2017, GENDA was defeated by a 3-6 vote in the Senate Committee on Investigations and Government Operations.  On May 15, 2018, the Senate Committee on Investigations and Government Operations also defeated GENDA by a vote of 5–4. This would prove to be the final defeat of GENDA.

In 2019, the Committee on Investigations and Government Operations approved GENDA by a 6-0 vote. On January 15, 2019, the State Assembly and the State Senate passed the bill by votes of 100–40 and 42–19, respectively. Governor Andrew Cuomo signed GENDA into law on January 25, 2019.

Support for GENDA  
Actress, producer and transgender advocate Laverne Cox traveled to Albany, New York, in March 2013 to speak with New York State legislators to encourage them to pass GENDA. Concerns regarding discrimination in employment, housing, and bathroom rights – meaning whether or not transgender people should have access to sex-segregated spaces that are consistent with their gender identities – motivate Cox and other advocates. Despite fears often cited by opponents of this policy, when directly asked by the Senate in October 2012, the chiefs of police in Rochester and Albany noted they found no instances of a transgender person abusing the law and using a segregated bathroom or locker room to harass or perform illegal acts. The chief of police in Albany, Steven Chief Krokoff, stated, "We have had these protections in place in the City of Albany going on for almost a decade, and I am pleased to say it has helped in a number of areas, not only the protection of transgender individuals but our ability to effectively create a safe atmosphere for all citizens of the City of Albany."

See also
 Sexual Orientation Non-Discrimination Act
 New York Human Rights Law

References

External links
 New York State Department of Human Rights on GENDA
 Original Assembly bill from 2003
 Original Senate bill from 2003

Transgender law in the United States
LGBT rights in New York (state)
Transgender rights in the United States
LGBT law in the United States
2019 in LGBT history